Grevillea burrowa, commonly known as Burrowa grevillea, is a species of flowering plant in the family Proteaceae and is endemic to a restricted area of Victoria, Australia. It is a spreading shrub with oblong to egg-shaped leaves, and clusters of reddish-pink flowers.

Description

Taxonomy
Grevillea burrowa was first formally described in 2015 by William Mitchell Molyneux and Susan G. Forrester in the journal Muelleria from specimens collected in the Burrowa-Pine Mountain National Park in 2002. The taxon had been listed in the 7th edition of the Census of the Vascular Plants of Victoria in 2003 as Grevillea sp. aff. oxyantha (Mt Burrowa). The specific epithet (burrowa) refers to the type location on Mount Burrowa and to the Burrowa-Pine Mountain National Park where the species is apparently endemic. The name "Burrowa" in turn may be the word for white-breasted sea eagle in the Pallanganmiddang language.

Distribution and habitat

Conservation status
This grevillea is listed as "vulnerable" in the Department of Environment and Primary Industries' Advisory List of Rare Or Threatened Plants In Victoria.

References

burrowa
Flora of Victoria (Australia)
Proteales of Australia
Plants described in 2015